The following is a list of episodes for the British comedy series The Comic Strip Presents..., created by the titular comedy troupe, which originally ran for three series and one special on Channel 4 from 1983 to 1988. Two series and three specials subsequently aired on BBC Two between 1990 and 1993. Since then, specials have aired sporadically on Channel 4, beginning in 1998 and most recently in 2016. The collective also created four theatrical films between 1985 and 2004. There have been a total of 42 television episodes, four feature films, and one short film.

Short film (1981)

Series 1 (1982—83)

Series 2 (1983—84)

Specials and films (1984–87)

Series 3 (1988)

Series 4 (1990)

Specials and film (1991–92)

Series 5 (1993)

Specials and films (1998–2016)

Notes

References 

The Comic Strip
Comic Strip Presents